Tom Kennedy (born July 29, 1996) is an American football wide receiver for the Detroit Lions of the National Football League (NFL) and former professional lacrosse player. He played college football at Bryant.

College career
Kennedy committed to play both football and lacrosse at Bryant University. He initially quit football after his freshman year in order to focus on lacrosse and was a first team All-Northeast Conference selection midfielder in 2017 as he helped the team to an appearance in the 2017 NCAA Division I Men's Lacrosse Championship. He ultimately decided to return to football going into his senior year and was named first team All-NEC after catching 57 passes for 888 yards and nine touchdowns, while also rushing 66 yards and three touchdowns on 12 carries. Kennedy was again named All-NEC at midfielder in his final lacrosse season. He returned to Bryant from playing professional lacrosse to play a final season of college football and had 33 receptions for 410 yards and a touchdown.

Professional lacrosse career
Kennedy was drafted in the third round of the 2018 Major League Lacrosse Draft by the Boston Cannons. He played in six games for the team during the 2018 season before leaving to play football at Bryant as a graduate student.

Professional football career

Kennedy signed with the Detroit Lions as an undrafted free agent on May 12, 2019 after participating in a rookie minicamp. He was waived on August 31, 2019 as part of final roster cuts at the end of training camp but was re-signed to the team's practice squad the following day. Kennedy was promoted to the Lions' active roster on September 27, 2019. Kennedy made his NFL debut on September 29, 2019 against the Kansas City Chiefs. He was waived on October 14 and re-signed to the practice squad. On December 30, 2019, Kennedy was signed to a reserve/future contract.

On September 5, 2020, Kennedy was waived by the Lions and signed to the practice squad the next day. He signed a reserve/future contract on January 5, 2021.

On October 17, 2021, due to injuries to fellow receivers Tyrell Williams and Quintez Cephus, Kennedy caught his first NFL catch in a 34-11 loss against the Cincinnati Bengals. In the same game, he also returned 4 kick returns for 83 yards. He was waived on November 8, 2021 and re-signed to the practice squad. He was promoted back to the active roster on November 20. On January 9, 2022, Kennedy recorded his first NFL touchdown, throwing a 75-yard touchdown pass to Kalif Raymond on a trick play against the Green Bay Packers. The Lions would go on to defeat the Packers, 37-30.

On August 30, 2022, Kennedy was waived by the Lions and signed to the practice squad the next day. He was promoted to the active roster on October 5. He was waived on December 17 and re-signed to the practice squad. He signed a reserve/future contract on January 9, 2023.

References

External links
Bryant Bulldogs bio
Detroit Lions bio

1996 births
Living people
Players of American football from New York (state)
Sportspeople from Nassau County, New York
People from Farmingdale, New York
American football wide receivers
Bryant Bulldogs men's lacrosse players
Bryant Bulldogs football players
Boston Cannons players
Detroit Lions players